Eckart Kaphengst (born 12 September 1958) is a German sailor. He competed in the Tornado event at the 1984 Summer Olympics.

References

External links
 

1958 births
Living people
German male sailors (sport)
Olympic sailors of West Germany
Sailors at the 1984 Summer Olympics – Tornado
Sportspeople from Hamburg
A-Class sailors
Nacra 17 class sailors